Oliver Daniel (November 24, 1911 – December 30, 1990) was an American arts administrator, musicologist, and composer.

He worked as a music executive for CBS, then took a job at BMI, creating that organization's Concert Music Department in 1954.  Also in 1954 he helped found the CRI (Composers Recordings, Inc.) record label, along with composers Otto Luening and Douglas Moore.  In 2000, CRI released a tribute CD for Daniel, titled Looking to the East.

For many years, Daniel worked with and promoted composers such as Henry Cowell, Lou Harrison, Alan Hovhaness, Colin McPhee, and Peggy Glanville-Hicks.  He also wrote an exhaustive (and somewhat hagiographic) biography of the conductor Leopold Stokowski titled Leopold Stokowski: A Counterpoint of View (1982).

For much of his life Daniel lived in Scarsdale, New York, with his partner Donald Ott.

References

External links 

 Oliver Daniel Correspondence with Ernst Krenek MSS 43. Special Collections & Archives, UC San Diego Library.

1911 births
1990 deaths
People from Scarsdale, New York
American LGBT musicians
Musicians from New York (state)
American male composers
20th-century American composers
20th-century American musicologists
20th-century American male musicians
20th-century American LGBT people